Tom Nijssen and Cyril Suk were the defending champions, but lost in the first round to Mark Kratzmann and Wally Masur.

Kratzmann and Masur won the title by defeating Steve DeVries and David Macpherson 6–3, 7–6 in the final.

Seeds

Draw

Draw

References

External links
 Official results archive (ATP)
 Official results archive (ITF)

1993 ATP Tour
Eurocard Open